Nemoria darwiniata, the Columbian emerald, is a species of emerald moth in the family Geometridae. It was first described by Harrison Gray Dyar Jr. in 1904 and it is found in North America.

The MONA or Hodges number for Nemoria darwiniata is 7035.

Subspecies
There are two subspecies:
 Nemoria darwiniata darwiniata g
 Nemoria darwiniata punctularia Barnes & McDunnough, 1918 c g
Data sources: i = ITIS, c = Catalogue of Life, g = GBIF, b = Bugguide.net

References

Further reading

External links

 

Geometrinae
Articles created by Qbugbot
Moths described in 1904